Kori rotti is a spicy dish of Tulu Udupi-Mangalorean cuisine, a combination of red-chili and coconut milk based chicken curry and crisp, dry wafers made from boiled rice. Kori means chicken in Tulu.

See also 
 List of chicken dishes
 Mangalorean cuisine
 Udupi cuisine

External links
How to make kori rotti

References 

Indian rice dishes
Karnataka cuisine
Mangalorean cuisine
Indian chicken dishes